Eresiomera petersi, the Peters' pearly, is a butterfly in the family Lycaenidae. It is found in central and eastern Liberia, Ivory Coast and Ghana. The habitat consists of forests.

References

Butterflies described in 1956
Poritiinae